Portsmouth Raceway Park is a three-eights mile dirt track located approximately 1 mile west of Portsmouth, Ohio. The track was built in 1990 by Owner/Operator Boone Coleman.
The track hosts weekly racing events throughout the summer months, including the classes, Late Model, Modified, Limited Late Model, and Bomber.
In 2009 the track hosted its first televised event, The "Big Red Book" River Days Rumble, featuring the Lucas Oil Late Model Series. The series made two appearances at the track in 2010, featuring one televised event, the two day "Pepsi 75 – River Days Rumble" paying $20,000 to the winner. 
In 2012 the 'crown jewel' racing event, The Dirt Track World Championship, was hosted at the speedway. The race, the thirty-second annual running of the event, paid $50,000 to the winner and was televised on the SPEED Network and sanctioned by the Lucas Oil Late Model Series. The announcement was made during the D.T.W.C. weekend that the thirty-third annual hosting of the event would also take place at the speedway under Lucas Oil series sanction. The DTWC now pays $100,000 to win and Brandon Sheppard of New Berlin, IL is the defending champion (2019).

Track history 
The track is built on a site that once housed a Shawnee Indian campground, but the Shawnee were run off the land by white settlers. On June 3, 1799 the town of Alexandria was founded on the site. The town would eventually be moved to what is currently known as Portsmouth, Ohio in 1813 because of multiple floods.
As time went on the site was converted into farmland. Current owner Boone Coleman purchased the land in the 1970s.

In the summer of 1990 Coleman began excavation on the site, when asked about his intentions he replied "My son Tim has a racecar and no place to practice!" Boone later decided to try to recover some of the money he spent building the track, and installed grandstands and the first season kicked off in late 1990, only two races were held that year. The first full season of racing was held at PRP in 1991. In 1992 the grandstands and concession areas at the track were destroyed when vandals took one of the tracks dozers on a rampage. The track crew was able to rebuild the track and was ready to race again within two weeks.

In 2000 the track was converted from a one-third mile to three-eights mile.

Track records 
The current track record at Portsmouth Raceway Park in the Late Model class is held by Lucas Oil Late Model Dirt Series driver, Scott Bloomquist at a 13.840

The track record at the old one-third mile track was set by local businessman and driver RJ Conley in his popular #71C at 13.595.

Former Track Champions 
 1991
Mini Sprint – Tracy Hoover
Modified – Richard Callihan
Street Stock – Bob Dean
Bombers – Duane Pick
 1992
Mini Sprint – Tracy Hoover
Modified – Richard Callihan
Street Stock – Bob Dean
Bombers – Larry Harr
 1993
Late Model – Delmas Conley
Modified – Marty Horton
Street Stock – Rick Walker
Bombers – Don Coriell
 1994
Late Model – Rick Walker
Modified – Richard Callihan
Street Stock – Marty Horton
Bombers – Tony DeHart
 1995
Late Model – Charlie Seymour
Modified – Marty Horton
Street Stock – Phillip Harding
Bombers – Tony DeHart
 1996
Late Model – Bob Adams, Jr.
Modified – Jeff Cunningham
Street Stock – Chris Blair
Bombers – Tony DeHart
 1997
Late Model – Bob Adams, Jr.
Modified – Tim Tribby
Street Stock – Kenny McCann
Bombers – Bubby McCarty
 1998
Late Model – Bill Bocook
Modified – Tim Tribby
Street Stock – John Melvin
Bombers – Danny Hamilton
 1999
Late Model – Craig Leist
Modified – Tony DeHart
Street Stock – John Melvin
Bombers – Bo Cox
 2000
Late Model – Kenny Christy
Modified – Eddie Harmon
Street Stock – Tim Robinson
Bombers – Phillip Kouns
 2001
Late Model – Aaron Bapst
Modified – Bo Cox
Limited Late Model – Mike Steele
Bombers – Donald Sensabaugh
 2002
Late Model – Kenny Christy
Modified – Eddie Harmon
Limited Late Model – John Melvin
Bombers – Josh McGuire
 2003
Late Model – R.J. Conley
Modified – Eddie Harmon
Limited Late Model – John Melvin
Bombers – Josh McGuire
 2004
Late Model – R.J. Conley
Modified – Eddie Harmon
Limited Late Model – Jeff Stevens
Bombers – Jeremie Bretz
 2005
Late Model – Aaron Bapst
Modified – Adam Jordan
Limited Late Model – Jeff Stevens
Bombers – Jeremie Bretz
 2006
Late Model – Jackie Boggs
Modified – Doug Adkins
Limited Late Model – John Melvin
Bombers – Shane Pendleton
 2007
Late Model – Audie Swartz
Modified – Rick Walker
Limited Late Model – John Melvin
Bombers – Shane Pendleton
 2008
Late Model – Jackie Boggs
Modified – Doug Adkins
Limited Late Model – John Melvin
Bombers – Shane Pendleton
2009
Late Model – Kenny Christy
Modified – Doug Adkins
Limited Late Model – John Melvin
Bomber – Jeremie Bretz
2010
Late Model – RJ Conley
Modified – David McWilliams
Limited Late Model – Evyian Terry
Bomber – Jeremie Bretz
2011
Late Model – Chris Wilson
Modified – Doug Adkins
Limited Late Model – John Melvin
Bomber – Robbie Lewis

External links 
 Official Site

Dirt oval race tracks in the United States
Motorsport venues in Ohio
Buildings and structures in Scioto County, Ohio
Tourist attractions in Scioto County, Ohio